The Supreme Soviet of the Turkmen SSR was the supreme soviet (main legislative institution) of the Turkmen SSR, one of the union republics of the Soviet Union. The Supreme Soviet of the Turkmen SSR was established in 1938 and disbanded in 1992. It was succeeded by the Assembly of Turkmenistan in 1992.

Chairmen of the Supreme Soviet

Chairmen of the Presidium of the Supreme Soviet 
The Presidium of the Supreme Soviet of the Turkmen SSR was dissolved on January 18, 1990. Thus, all powers of the Chairman of the Presidium were transferred to the Chairman of the Supreme Soviet of the Turkmen SSR.

See also 

 Supreme Soviet
 Assembly of Turkmenistan

References 

Historical legislatures
Turkmen Soviet Socialist Republic
Government of Turkmenistan
1938 establishments in the Soviet Union
1992 disestablishments in Turkmenistan
Defunct unicameral legislatures
Turkmen